Devil's Elbow or Devils Elbow may refer to:

Geography

Australia
Devil's Elbow (Murray River), a bend in the Murray River, New South Wales
Devil's Elbow, formerly on the Mount Barker Road, South Australia

Canada
Devil's Elbow (Stikine River), in British Columbia
Devil's Elbow Ski Area, Ontario, a ski areas in Canada

United Kingdom
Devil's Elbow, Isle of Man, a hairpin road bend
Devil's Elbow, a double-hairpin road bend in the Cairnwell Pass, Scotland
Devil's Elbow, the final corner at Mallory Park racing circuit in England
Devil's Elbow, a corner on the B6105 road north of Glossop, Derbyshire, in England

United States
Devils Elbow, Missouri, an unincorporated community
Devil's Elbow State Park, Heceta Head, Oregon

Music
Devils Elbow, a 2007 album by The Mess Hall
Devil's Elbow (Doug Kershaw album), 1972, and its title track
 "Devil's Elbow", 2013 song by Nick Warren

Other uses
The Devil's Elbow, a 1951 novel by Gladys Mitchell

See also